Phlipp Marschall (born 5 February 1988 in Bad Salzungen) is a German cross-country skier who competed between 2005 and 2015. His best World Cup finish was third in a 4 × 10 km relay event in Finland in March 2010.

Cross-country skiing results
All results are sourced from the International Ski Federation (FIS).

World Cup

Season standings

Team podiums

 1 podium

References

External links

1988 births
Living people
People from Bad Salzungen
People from Bezirk Suhl
German male cross-country skiers
Sportspeople from Thuringia